William Jonathan Northen (July 9, 1835 – March 25, 1913), was the 54th Governor of Georgia from 1890 to 1894, as well as a leading Baptist minister. Northen was president of the Georgia Baptist Convention from 1892 to 1910, and president of the Southern Baptist Convention from 1899 to 1901. His political rhetoric was based on his religious outlook, and often focused on racial issues at a time when lynching was increasing. Northen believed that advances in medicine and health would ultimately help African Americans achieve salvation.  He promoted the ideology of the modernizing New South, but did not abandon the policy of white supremacy.

Early life
Born in Jones County, Georgia, Northen graduated from Mercer University in 1853. He married Martha Neel in 1860 and served as a two-term member of the Georgia House of Representatives (1877–1881). He also was elected to the Georgia Senate in 1884. He was one of the biggest planters in Hancock County, Georgia.

Religious life
Northen was president of the Georgia Baptist Convention from 1892 to 1910, and president of the Southern Baptist Convention from 1899 to 1901.

Political life
Forced to resign from teaching, Northen began to farm. After the Civil War, farming in Georgia needed reform. Northen set his sights on the Georgia House of Representatives, where he earned the trust of fellow farmers in the same situation as he. He uplifted the spirits of his fellow Georgians, who elected him to two terms in the state House, one term in the state Senate, and president of the Georgia Agricultural Society. He was elected to his first term as governor in 1890.

Northen was a Democrat and a staunch foe of the Populist party. He promoted biracial cooperation among races and was against lynching, a common occurrence at the time. "I regret that the necessity exists for recommending the passage of more stringent laws for the protection of human life," he told state legislators in October 1892.

He was a proponent of temperance, and offered a temperance bill to the Georgia General Assembly on July 14, 1881. The bill passed the House, but was swiftly defeated in the Senate.

Despite opposition from Thomas E. Watson, who supported the Populist Party's candidate, Northen won a second term as governor in 1892.

Death and legacy
Northen contributed to the history of Georgia by compiling a seven-volume collection of biographical essays, published between 1907 and 1912, titled Men of Mark in Georgia. In 1911, he replaced Allen D. Candler as compiler of state records and contributed to the ongoing publication of the Colonial Records of Georgia series.

He died in 1913, in Atlanta, Georgia. Northen is buried in Oakland Cemetery.

See also

List of Southern Baptist Convention affiliated people
Southern Baptist Convention
Southern Baptist Convention Presidents

References

 Georgia Governor's Gravesites Field Guide (1776-2003)

External links

 Portrait of William J. Northen
 Gov. William Jonathan Northen historical marker

1835 births
1913 deaths
People from Jones County, Georgia
Mercer University alumni
Democratic Party members of the Georgia House of Representatives
Democratic Party Georgia (U.S. state) state senators
Democratic Party governors of Georgia (U.S. state)
19th-century American politicians
Burials at Oakland Cemetery (Atlanta)
Southern Baptist Convention presidents
19th-century Baptists
Temperance activists